Axi (Chinese: 阿细 Axi; Ahi;) is one of the Loloish languages spoken by the Yi people of China. The Axi are one of the main linguistic sub-branches of Yi, and the Axi tiaoyue is a dance of the Axi speaking Yi people accompanied by the sanhu.

Axi is spoken in Mile, Shilin, Kunming, Luxi, and Huaning counties by about 110,000 speakers.

Phonology

Further reading

References

Loloish languages
Languages of China